The Nordmøre Museum is a Norwegian regional cultural history museum for the Nordmøre district in Møre og Romsdal County. The museum has its head office in Kristiansund and is organized as a foundation. Its office is located at Storgata 19.

The museum currently has branches in all of the municipalities in Nordmøre: two departments in Smøla (the Smøla museum and Norwegian Marsh Museum), in Averøy and Eide (the Old Kvernes Rural Museum), Tingvoll, Surnadal (the Åsen Village Museum, Kleiva Poet's Home, and Svinvik Arboretum), Rindal, Aure (the Kråksund Fishing Museum), Halsa (a museum dedicated to the traditional geitbåt 'goat boat' and the Husasnotra boat-building area), and Sunndal (the Sunndal Museum in the Leikvin Heritage Park). The museum has a cooperation agreement with the municipality of Gjemnes. The head of the museum is Ståle Tangen.

The museum was established as the Kristiansund Museum in 1894, and from the beginning the main building was an exhibition pavilion from the large-scale fishing exhibition held in 1892. Together with the museum's founder, Anders Sandvig, the committed young museologist Wilhelm Lund laid plans in Lillehammer for a major open-air cultural museum in Kristiansund. The Almskår farmhouse, one of the last authentic open-hearth farmhouses from Nordmøre, was moved to Kristiansund. The museum also acquired a raised granary before it was realized that the weather in Kristiansund was not suited to a regular open-air museum with transferred buildings.

The Kristiansund Museum was badly damaged when the city with its old wooden houses was bombed by German aircraft in April 1940. The museum lost most of its collection when the pavilion burned down.

In the 1960s, the small open-air museum was moved to Dalen Farm on the outskirts of the city, which was regarded as preservation-worthy. In 1965 the museum opened a new fireproof brick building at the Knudtzondal Farm on the city's outskirts. In 1980, the museum focused on heritage conservation at the harbor in Kristiansund, where the museum is represented by the Norwegian Dried Cod Museum and Mellem Shipyard, where historical sailing ships are also restored.

References

External links
 Nordmøre Museum homepage

Culture in Møre og Romsdal
Museums in Møre og Romsdal
Nordmøre
Averøy
Smøla
Tingvoll
Surnadal
Rindal
Sunndal
Museums established in 1894
1894 establishments in Norway